Thierry Tea is a French-Cambodian businessman, entrepreneur, and investor. He is the founder and managing director of the Philippines-based aviation company, PhilJets Aero Services Inc.

Tea became the youngest CEO and president of Eurocopter Philippines (now Airbus Helicopters Philippines) in 2007 at the age of 27. At 29, Tea became the head of EADS (now Airbus Group) in the Philippines, becoming one of the youngest executives in the group.

He also holds the position of chairman of PhilJets Aero Charter Corp (formerly Zenith Air Inc), managing partner of Agama Investments in Cambodia, managing director of Starline Global Industries and managing director of Starline Aero Investment in Singapore.

Aviation industry

Airbus
Tea returned to Paris, where he started his career with Airbus Helicopters as a back office project executive within the Oil & Gas (Petroleum Industry) Department. Shortly thereafter, he moved back to Asia to work within a subsidiary of the company. He obtained a Volunteer for International Experience (VIE) internship with Airbus Helicopters Southeast Asia in Singapore.

Tea became a sales manager for Eurocopter Philippines, a subsidiary of EADS, at the age of 21. The company was located at Manila International Airport in Pasay. He moved to the Philippines as a trainee for Bell Helicopters in 2004. Tea became the president & CEO of Eurocopter Philippines in 2007. In 2012, Tea was appointed head of the Airbus Group in the Philippines, covering sales campaigns for ATR, Airbus Helicopters, plus their defense and space division.

He was formerly on the board of directors of the French Chamber of Commerce in the Philippines from 2008 to 2010.

In his last year within the Airbus Group, Tea was part of the team that won the Airbus Campaign with Philippine Airlines when the airline purchased 70 Airbus planes

PhilJets Group
Tea founded the aviation solution company PhilJets Group with Matea Delen, Ming Asuncion and Mia Malanyaon in 2013. At its inception, the company offered aircraft maintenance and facilitation of aircraft transactions between 3rd parties. They acquired the air charter company Zenith Air and re-branded into PhilJets Aero Charter. They signed their first chartering contract with the American reality competition show Survivor. The company is based in Manila Domestic Airport and operates in the Philippines and ASEAN. As of January 2019, they had 70 employees.

As of September 2017, the PhilJets Group consisted of PhilJets Aero Services and PhilJets Aero Charter. Its parent company, Starline Global Industries, deals with business transactions and consultation. PhilJets Aero Services deals with spare parts sales and MRO. PhilJets Aero Charter deals in tour packages, private helicopter chartering, and emergency medical services. The company also deals in air cargo services, engineering and fleet management, and representation of foreign firms.

PhilJets partnered with GrabTaxi to launch the air taxi service GrabHeli through the GrabTaxi application. The beta version was released in November 2015, with the service marketed as a "solution to the heavy traffic in Metro Manila". The service charged  (approximately ) per person and serviced from Makati, Bonifacio Global City, and Pasay to Manila International Airport. It was in competition with Uber's air taxi service, Uberchopper. As of April 2019, GrabHeli has been discontinued with Uberchopper having been sold to Grab.

Tea is the founder and managing director of the PhilJets Group. PhilJets Group includes PhilJets Aero Services Inc and PhilJets Aero Charter Corp.

PhilJets Aero Services Inc is a MRO company, and has an AMO (Aircraft Maintenance Organization) license delivered by the Civil Aviation Authority of the Philippines since July 2015.

PhilJets and Tea provide advisory services to Airbus Group in the Philippines  for business development. The company advises AJ Walter in the Philippines 

PhilJets Aero Charter Corp developed tours by helicopters  and private flights services throughout the Philippines, including air taxi services. Its services include aerial and scenic flights, mining, VIP and corporate flight services. The company that provides aircraft management, operates 2 H 130 (ex EC130T2), 1 AS350B2, 1 R44 helicopters.
The operator is active in natural disaster reliefs or emergency evacuations. It develops its helitours.
PhilJets will be the first operator to receive and operate the Bell Helicopter 505  Jet Ranger X in the Philippines.

PhilJets is member of the Philippine Chamber of Commerce and Industry and the Asian Business Aviation Association. As of April 2015, Tea represents PhilJets at the Philippines-France Business Council of the Makati Business Club.

FinTech
Tea co-founded in 2016, WeCube Inc, a collaborative ecosystem for start up in the digital industry. He also became the Ambassador of La French Tech Philippines. French Tech is a label created by the French Government to support the French Start Ups in France and worldwide.

Career in Cambodia
In 2014, he incorporated his first company in Cambodia, Agama Investments Co Ltd, a boutique investment company engaged in private equity, venture capital, management, consulting, financing, trading and real estate.

Tea is an adviser of the Anvaya Council.

He also started mango plantations with TK Orient in Kampong Speu Province.

Tea is the co-founder and director of Asiaware Cambodia, an organization that supports children in the Kampong Speu Province.

Personal life
Tea is of Chinese Teochew descent and was born 張勇漢 in Paris, France on April 22, 1981.

Tea's parents are Chinese Cambodian who immigrated to Paris, France as refugees, where they lived in Quartier Asiatique. Tea later studied in Singapore.

Tea is married to Lynda Him, French Chinese Cambodian of Hainanese and Teochew descent. She is a businesswoman engaged into rice trading. Him also holds a master's degree from Negocia (Novancia) Business School Paris, studied in Drexel University in the US and Nanyang Polytechnic in Singapore. They met while working for Airbus Helicopters in Asia.

Tea speaks French, English, Chinese (Teochew), and Khmer. He has been a Chevalier of the Confrérie de la Chaîne des Rôtisseurs, Baillage Cambodia since May 2015.

He has a daughter, Julia Tea.

Awards and recognition
At the age of 28 in 2009, Tea was nominated by the Prime Minister of France as a Foreign Trade Adviser for France (Conseiller du Commerce Exterieur pour la France).

On January 10, 2011, he was honored by People Asia magazine as one of the "People of the Year 2010" for sending out helicopters to aid in rescue missions during Typhoon Ondoy.

References

1981 births
Businesspeople in aviation
French company founders
Living people
Businesspeople from Paris
French people of Cambodian descent
Cambodian people of Chinese descent
Chaoshanese people